The William Dean Howells Medal is awarded by the American Academy of Arts and Letters.  Established in 1925 and named for William Dean Howells, it is given once every five years, generally in recognition of the most distinguished American novel published during that period, although some awards have been made to novelists for their general body of work.  The recipient of the award is chosen, by a committee drawn from the membership of the Academy, from among those candidates nominated by a member of the Academy.

Past winners

External links 

 
 

American fiction awards
Awards established in 1925
1925 establishments in the United States
Awards of the American Academy of Arts and Letters